Bank Foot is a Tyne and Wear Metro station, serving the suburb of Kenton Bank Foot, Newcastle upon Tyne in Tyne and Wear, England. It joined the network as a terminus station on 10 May 1981, following the opening of the second phase of the network, between South Gosforth and Bank Foot. The station was used by 0.11 million passengers in 2017–18, making it the third-least-used station on the network, after St Peter's and Pallion.

History
The station is located at the site of the former Kenton Bank station, which opened on 1 June 1905 as part of the Gosforth and Ponteland Light Railway. The line closed to passengers on 17 June 1929, with goods services operating from the station until January 1966.

Following the opening of the Tyne and Wear Metro station as a terminus in May 1981, the approach to Bank Foot was single track, with one platform on the south side (now used by trains towards Airport). For the first few years of operation, the Tyne and Wear Metro shared the line with freight services running to ICI Callerton, where explosives were transferred from rail to road for onward transport to quarries in Northumberland. This traffic ceased following the closure of ICI Callerton, in March 1989.

There were originally three tracks here. On the south side was the platform line, on the north side a siding for use by the Tyne and Wear Metro, and in the middle the non-electrified through line for freight services. The ownership boundary between the Tyne and Wear Metro and British Rail was the level crossing on Station Road, to the west of the station.

When the line was extended to Airport, the bridge to the east was re-built as double track, with Bank Foot station re-modelled as a double track station. A second platform was built on the north side (now used for trains towards South Hylton). The level crossing was also re-built in the same style as the other open level crossings on the system.

Following the opening of the  line between Bank Foot and Airport on 17 November 1991, the station opened to through services. During the construction of the line, a dedicated bus service operated between Bank Foot and Newcastle International Airport.

In October 2012, traffic enforcement cameras were installed at the level crossings at Bank Foot and Kingston Park. Similar cameras were installed at Callerton Parkway in 2008.

In 2018, the station, along with others on the Airport branch, were refurbished as part of the Metro: All Change programme. The project saw improvements to accessibility, security and energy efficiency, as well as the re-branding of the station to the new black and white corporate colour scheme.

Facilities 
Step-free access is available at all stations across the Tyne and Wear Metro network, with ramped access to both platforms at Bank Foot. The station is equipped with ticket machines, waiting shelter, seating, next train information displays, timetable posters, and an emergency help point on both platforms. Ticket machines are able to accept payment with credit and debit card (including contactless payment), notes and coins. The station is also fitted with smartcard validators, which feature at all stations across the network.

A pay and display car park is available, with 62 spaces. There is also the provision for cycle parking, with eight cycle pods available for use.

Services 
, the station is served by up to five trains per hour on weekdays and Saturday, and up to four trains per hour during the evening and on Sunday.

Rolling stock used: Class 599 Metrocar

Notes

References

External links
Timetable and station information for Bank Foot

Newcastle upon Tyne
1981 establishments in England
Railway stations in Great Britain opened in 1981
Tyne and Wear Metro Green line stations
Transport in Newcastle upon Tyne
Transport in Tyne and Wear
